Buddy Fields may refer to:

 Buddy Fields (baseball), American baseball player
 Buddy Fields (songwriter) (1889−1965), songwriter